The Alai Beds is an Early Eocene (Ypresian, or Bumbanian in the ALMA classification) geologic formation in the Osh Region of southwestern Kyrgyzstan. The formation has provided many fossils of mammals, lizards, turtles and snakes.

Description 
The Paleogene Alai Beds have a limited distribution, and are restricted to the northern slope of Aktash Range, formed by Paleozoic rocks, which is one of the foothills of the Turkestan Range. Despite of their close position, the Paleogene deposits in these outcrops are varied greatly in composition and thickness of layers.

At the base of the Upper Alai Beds there is a layer of conglomerate which produces a number of marine vertebrates, but a few terrestrial vertebrates including mammals. The section I1 is more complete and has a greater thickness, but produces a few shark teeth only.

Fossil content 
The formation has provided the following fossils:

Mammals 
Artiodactyls

 Eolantianius russelli
 Diacodexis sp.
 Diacodexeidae indet.

Cimolesta

 Metasarcodon udovichenkoi
 Nuryctes alayensis
 Palaeoryctidae indet.

Hyaenodonta
 Isphanatherium ferganensis
 Neoparapterodon sp.

Lipotyphla
 Protogalericius averianovi

Perissodactyls

 Eoletes tianshanicus
 Pataecops minutissimus
 Sharamynodon kirghisensis
 Teleolophus medius

Rodents

 Aktashmys montealbus
 Alaymys ctenodactylus
 Anatolimys rozhdestvenskii
 Gobiolagus hekkeri
 Khodzhentia vinogradovi
 Advenimus cf. burkei
 Petrokozlovia cf. notos
 Saykanomys cf. bohlini
 ?Adolomys sp.
 Ctenodactyloidea indet.

Reptiles 
Lizards
 ?Saniwa sp.
 Agamidae indet.
 Uromastycinae indet.

Snakes

 Calamagras turkestanicus
 Palaeophis ferganicus
 Boidae indet.

Turtles
 Hadrianus vialovi
 Cheloniinae indet.

See also 

 Ypresian formations
 Ieper Group of Belgium
 Fur Formation of Denmark
 London Clay Formation of England
 Silveirinha Formation of Portugal
 Wasatchian formations
 Nanjemoy Formation of the eastern United States
 Wasatch Formation of the western United States
 Itaboraian formations
 Itaboraí Formation of Brazil
 Laguna del Hunco Formation of Argentina

References

Bibliography 

 
 
 
 
 
 
 
 
 
 
 
 
 
 
 

Geologic formations of Kyrgyzstan
Paleogene System of Asia
Ypresian Stage
Conglomerate formations
Siltstone formations
Shallow marine deposits
Fossiliferous stratigraphic units of Asia
Paleontology in Kyrgyzstan
Formations